The Park Place School in the Point Breeze neighborhood of Pittsburgh, Pennsylvania was built in 1903 at the then-extravagant cost of $100,000, with 9 classrooms and a basement play area.

The school closed in 1979 and was listed on the National Register of Historic Places in 1986. Later, it briefly functioned as an apartment building, but since 2012 it has hosted part of the Environmental Charter School.

See also
Linden Avenue School

References

School buildings on the National Register of Historic Places in Pennsylvania
School buildings completed in 1903
Schools in Pittsburgh
National Register of Historic Places in Pittsburgh
1903 establishments in Pennsylvania